SICAF may refer to:

 Seoul International Cartoon and Animation Festival
 Société d'investissement à capital fixe (incorporated investment fund)
 Société International de Choux, Agriculture et Fleurs, main horticulture association in France.